Palleura nitida is a moth of the family Yponomeutidae. It is found in southern Australia. Information about this moth is sparse, though it was first described in 1926.

External links
Australian Faunal Directory

Yponomeutidae
Moths described in 1926